Kebriyai (also Romanized as Kebrīyā’ī) is a village in Baharestan Rural District, in the Central District of Nain County, Isfahan Province, Iran. At the 2006 census, its population was 15, in 5 families.

References 

Populated places in Nain County